Jan Schanda (born 17 August 1977 in Wolfsburg) is a German footballer. He spent one seasons in the Bundesliga with VfL Wolfsburg, as well as three seasons in the 2. Bundesliga with Eintracht Braunschweig, VfB Lübeck, and VfL Osnabrück.

References

External links

1977 births
Living people
People from Wolfsburg
Footballers from Lower Saxony
German footballers
VfL Wolfsburg players
Eintracht Braunschweig players
VfL Osnabrück players
VfB Lübeck players
SC Fortuna Köln players
Association football defenders
Bundesliga players
2. Bundesliga players
3. Liga players